This is a list of United States national Golden Gloves champions in the light flyweight division, along with the state or region they represented.

1975: Claudel Atkins – St. Louis, Missouri
1976: Louis Curtis – Washington, D.C.
1977: Not contested
1978: Richard Sandoval – Las Vegas, Nevada
1979: Richard Sandoval – Los Angeles, California
1980: Steven McCrory – Detroit, Michigan
1981: Jesse Benavides – Fort Worth, Texas
1982: Jose Rosario – Elizabeth, Pennsylvania
1983: Johnny Tapia – New Mexico
1984: Israel Acosta – Milwaukee, Wisconsin
1985: Arthur Johnson – St. Louis, Missouri
1986: Michael Carbajal – Las Vegas, Nevada
1987: Eric Griffin – Louisiana
1988: Mark Johnson – Washington, D.C.
1989: Eric Griffin – Fort Worth, Texas
1990: Russell Roberts – Louisiana
1991: Dan Davis – Pennsylvania
1992: James Harris – Washington, D.C.
1993: Floyd Mayweather Jr. – Michigan
1994: Eric Morel – Milwaukee
1995: Juaquin Gallardo – Southern California
1996: Gerald Tucker – Cincinnati, Ohio
1997: Sergio Espinosa – Southern California
1998: Bradley Martinez – Colorado
1999: Brian Viloria – Wisconsin
2000: Ronald Siler – Cincinnati
2001: Aaron Alafa – California
2002: Raytona Whitfield – Knoxville, Tennessee
2003: Austroberto Juarez – California
2004: Israel Crespo – Pennsylvania
2005: Roberto Ceron – Knoxville, Tennessee
2006: Luis Yáñez – Texas
2007: Luis Yáñez – Texas
2008: Louie Byrd – Colorado/New Mexico
2009: Miguel Cartagena – Pennsylvania
2010: Louie Byrd – Colorado/New Mexico
2011: Santos Vasquez – Nevada
2012: Leroy Davila – New Jersey
2013 – Nico Hernandez – Kansas
2014 – Christian Carto – Philadelphia
2015 - Pablo Ramirez - Texas
2016 - Pablo Ramirez - Texas
2017 - Angel Martinez - Rockford, Illinois
2019 - Angel(the reaper)Herrera - [[Aurora Illinois]Angel Herrera  finishes what his coach started at National Golden Gloves|date=2019-05-11

References

External links
Golden Gloves official website

Golden Gloves